Mitzi Waltz (born 1962) is a scholar of media and disability studies. As of 2020, she is a research associate at Vrije Universiteit Amsterdam.

Waltz was formerly an associate lecturer in autism studies at the Autism Centre of Sheffield Hallam University in the United Kingdom. Before her appointment in 2012, she was a lecturer in autism studies at the Autism Centre for Education and Research (ACER), University of Birmingham and a senior lecturer at the University of Sunderland.

Publications

References

External links 
 
 

Autism researchers
Academics of the University of Birmingham
Academics of Sheffield Hallam University
1962 births
Living people
Disability studies academics
Media studies writers
Academic staff of Vrije Universiteit Amsterdam
British women non-fiction writers